The 1989 NCAA Division I Women's Tennis Championships were the eighth annual championships to determine the national champions of NCAA Division I women's singles, doubles, and team collegiate tennis in the United States.

Stanford defeated UCLA, 5–0, to win their fourth consecutive and sixth overall national title.

Host sites
The tournaments were hosted at Linder Stadium at Ring Tennis Complex at the University of Florida in Gainesville, Florida. The men's and women's tournaments would not be held at the same site until 2006.

Team tournament

See also
1989 NCAA Division I Men's Tennis Championships
NCAA Division II Tennis Championships (Men, Women)
NCAA Division III Tennis Championships (Men, Women)

References

External links
List of NCAA Women's Tennis Champions

NCAA Division I tennis championships
NCAA Division I Women's Tennis Championships
NCAA Division I Women's Tennis Championships
NCAA Division I Women's Tennis Championships